Soroti–Amuria–Abim–Kotido Road is a road in the Eastern and Northern Regions of Uganda. The road  connects the towns of Soroti in Soroti District, to Amuria in Amuria District, Abim in Abim District, and Kotido, in Kotido District. Soroti and Amuria lie in the Teso sub-region, while Abim and Kotido are in the Karamoja sub-region.

Location
The coordinates of the road near Abim are 2°43'38.0"N, 34°39'51.0"E (Latitude:2.727237; Longitude:33.664159).

Overview
The road is gravel surface and in poor physical state. It is prone to flooding, and, when it does, it adversely disrupts travel between Soroti and Kotido.

Upgrading to bitumen
During a campaign speech on 2 December 2015, President Yoweri Museveni stated that this road is among the next batch of roads to be considered for upgrading to grade II bitumen surface. No specific timetable has been set.

See also
 List of roads in Uganda

References

External links
 Uganda National Road Authority Homepage
 Ugandan Government Increases Road Network Funding

Roads in Uganda
Soroti District
Amuria District
Abim District
Kotido District
Eastern Region, Uganda
Northern Region, Uganda